SM UB-14 was a German Type UB I submarine or U-boat in the German Imperial Navy during World War I. The submarine was also known by the Austro-Hungarian Navy designation of SM U-26.

UB-14 was ordered in October 1914 and was laid down at the AG Weser shipyard in Bremen in November. She carried two torpedoes for her two bow torpedo tubes and was also armed with a deck-mounted machine gun. UB-14 was broken into sections and shipped by rail to the Austrian port Pola for reassembly. She was launched and commissioned in March 1915 as SM UB-14 in the German Imperial Navy under the command of Oberleutnant zur See Heino von Heimburg.

Because Germany and Italy were not yet at war when UB-14 entered service, she was transferred in name only to the Austro-Hungarian Navy. The submarine retained her German captain and crew, and remained under German command as a part of the Kaiserliche Marines Pola Flotilla. While traveling to Constantinople (present-day Istanbul) to join the Constantinople Flotilla, UB-14 attacked two British troopships, sinking  with heavy loss of life, and seriously damaging . All three of UB-14s first victims were among the largest ships attacked by U-boats during the war.

Although UB-14 sank the British submarine  in the Sea of Marmara in November 1915, she spent most of the rest of her career patrolling in the Black Sea. The U-boat had only limited success there, sinking only three ships through the end of the war. After the war ended, the submarine was disarmed at Sevastopol and scuttled off that port in early 1919.

Design and construction 
After the German Army's rapid advance along the North Sea coast in the earliest stages of World War I, the German Imperial Navy found itself without suitable submarines that could be operated in the narrow and shallow seas off Flanders. Project 34, a design effort begun in mid-August 1914, produced the Type UB I design: a small submarine that could be shipped by rail to a port of operations and quickly assembled.

UB-14 was part of the initial allotment of seven submarines—numbered  to —ordered on 15 October from AG Weser of Bremen, just shy of two months after planning for the class began. UB-14 was laid down by Weser in Bremen on 9 November. She had a single  Körting 4-cylinder diesel engine for surface travel, and a single  Siemens-Schuckert electric motor for underwater travel, both attached to a single propeller shaft.

UB-14 was armed with two  torpedoes in two bow torpedo tubes. She was also outfitted for a single  machine gun on deck. UB-14s standard complement consisted of one officer and thirteen enlisted men.

Launching and commissioning 
Most of the UB I boats were shipped to their port of operations by rail, where they were assembled, launched, tested, and commissioned. Information on UB-14 suggests that she may not have followed that pattern as closely as most other boats. According to several sources, UB-14 was launched on 23 March 1915, and commissioned into the German Imperial Navy as SM UB-14 on 25 March under the command of Oberleutnant zur See Heino von Heimburg a 25-year-old first-time U-boat commander. Those same sources are silent on UB-14s whereabouts at the time, but information on UB-14 later shipment and arrival in the Mediterranean suggest that her initial launch and commissioning may have occurred in Germany.

UB-14 was shipped by rail in June to the main Austrian naval base at Pola, with an arrival date on the 12th. The process of shipping a UB I boat involved breaking the submarine down into what was essentially a knock down kit. Each boat was broken into approximately fifteen pieces and loaded onto eight railway flatcars. German engineers and technicians that accompanied earlier UB I boats to Pola worked under the supervision of Kapitänleutnant Hans Adam, head of the U-boat special command. Typically, the UB I assembly process took about two to three weeks.

While UB-14 made her way to Austria-Hungary, von Heimburg and his German crew were assigned to UB-15 at Pola. The submarine was temporarily commissioned into the German Imperial Navy before a subsequent transfer to the Austro-Hungarian Navy as its . UB-15/U-11 was handed over to the Austro-Hungarian Navy on 16 June, and von Heimburg and his crew were transferred intact on 21 June to UB-14, which was still a few days from completion.

At the outbreak of World War I in August 1914, Italy had declined to join its Triple Alliance partners—Germany and Austria-Hungary—in declaring war against the Entente Powers, and opted to remain neutral. Pressure from the United Kingdom and France swayed Italy to sign the secret 1915 Treaty of London on 26 April, in which Italy promised to leave the Triple Alliance and declare war against its former allies within a month in return for territorial gains after the end of the war. Because Italy initially declared war only on Austria-Hungary, Germany and Italy were not officially at war. As a consequence, German submarines operating in the Adriatic and the Mediterranean were all assigned Austrian numbers and flew the flag of Austria-Hungary when making attacks on Italian vessels; UB-14 was assigned the designation of U-26 and entered onto the rolls of the Austro-Hungarian Navy, despite the fact that she remained completely under German control. According to historian Lawrence Sondhaus, this dual numbering system reflected the close submarine cooperation between the two countries and still makes it difficult to distinguish between submarines of the two navies.

On 1 July, UB-14 joined the Pola Flotilla, and departed soon thereafter on her first patrol. On the night of 6/7 July, Italian armored cruisers that had recently been deployed at Venice undertook a "reconnaissance in force" off Pola in an attempt to discourage future Austrian sorties against the Italian coast. At dawn, the armored cruiser  crossed paths with UB-14 and was torpedoed. Amalfi quickly began listing to port and sank within 30 minutes with the loss of 67 men. At  displacement, Amalfi was one of the largest ships sunk by U-boats during the war. UB-14 escaped the scene without damage.

Aegean Sea 

Enver Pasha and other Turkish leaders had been pleading with their German and Austrian allies to send submarines to the Dardanelles to help attack the British and French fleet pounding Turkish positions. Since her intermediate refueling stop at Bodrum was beyond her limited range, UB-14 departed Pola under tow from an Austrian destroyer on 15 July 1915. UB-14s engine and gyrocompass broke down while off Crete, leaving the boat dead in the water for a time, but temporary repairs by the crew enabled the boat to make Bodrum on the 24th. A repair crew from Constantinople was dispatched—having to travel by train and camel just to reach UB-14—and the ship was ready to resume her journey on 13 August.

Shortly after departing Bodrum, UB-14 had just cleared the Greek island of Kos and was off the nearby island of Kandeloussa when von Heimburg sighted several potential victims. The first ship seen was the British hospital ship , headed to Alexandria from the Dardanelles. Von Heimburg, seeing the properly identified hospital ship, allowed Soudan to pass unmolested. The next ship was not so lucky, however. It was the unescorted , a Canadian ocean liner pressed into troopship duties. Royal Edward was headed in the opposite direction from Soudan: from Alexandria to the Dardanelles with reinforcements for the British 29th Infantry and a small group with the Royal Army Medical Corps, all of whom were destined for Gallipoli. Von Heimburg launched one of his two torpedoes from about a mile (2 km) away and hit Royal Edward in the stern; the ship sank stern-first in six minutes, with a large loss of life. Soudan and several other ships were able to rescue nearly 700 men, but over 900 died. While evading the rescue ships, which included two French destroyers, UB-14s compass broke down again, forcing a return to Bodrum on the morning of the 15th.

After repairs were completed at Bodrum, UB-14 continued on her way with a passenger, Prince Heinrich XXXVII Reuss of Köstritz (of the Reuss Junior Line) who needed passage to Constantinople. At 09:51 on 2 September, von Heimburg launched a single torpedo at the British troopship , which was carrying mostly Australian troops headed for Gallipoli. The torpedo scored a hit on the starboard bow of the liner, which immediately began to list in that direction. As the men boarded lifeboats to abandon ship, another torpedo narrowly missed the stricken ship. The British seaplane carrier  sped to the scene of the attack, and rescued nearly 700 men from the water. The hospital ship  was also on the scene and rescued a sizable number. A group of about 40 volunteers stayed on board Southland to help the crew, and with some towing assistance from Ben-my-Chree, were able to beach the ship on Lemnos. In all, fewer than 40 men died in the attack; among Southlands survivors was James Martin, who, upon his death less than two months later, became the youngest Australian known to have died in the war. The stricken ship had received serious damage, but was later repaired and returned to service. As with UB-14s first two targets, Southland was also the largest ships hit by U-boats, giving von Heimburg and UB-14 three victims from the list of the largest in their first three attacks.

After the attack on Southland, UB-14 broke down again and put in at Chanak to await repairs. While there on 4 September, word came of the British submarine  entangled in Turkish antisubmarine nets off Nagara Point. Von Heimburg, Prince Heinrich, and UB-14s cook, a man by the name of Herzig, set out in a rowboat to observe the Turkish attempts to destroy E7. After several mines that formed part of the net had been detonated to no avail, von Heimburg and his group rowed out and repeatedly dropped a plumb line until it contacted metal. Then, von Heimburg dropped a Turkish sinker mine with a shortened fuse right on top of E7. After the hand-dropped mine detonated too close for the British submarine's captain's comfort, he ordered his boat surfaced, abandoned, and scuttled. Between shellfire from the Turkish shore batteries and E7s scuttling charges, von Heimburg and company narrowly escaped harm. While most sources credit E7s sinking to the Turkish efforts, author Robert Stern contends that von Heimburg and UB-14 deserve partial credit for the demise of E7.

Black Sea 
After UB-14s repairs were completed, she continued on to Constantinople and, from there, began a patrol in the Black Sea on 3 October. After her return to Constantinople on the 19th, UB-14 was prepared for another patrol in the Black Sea. Just before her scheduled departure, however, the U-boat's destination was changed from the Black Sea to the Sea of Marmara and von Heimburg and UB-14 headed south on 5 November. While UB-14 had been in port on 30 November, Turkish forces had captured the  before the submarine or any of the confidential papers on board could be destroyed. When Turquoise was caught, her commander had not signaled her predicament to anyone, so a scheduled rendezvous with the British submarine —as far as anyone other than Turquoise or the Germans and Turks knew—was still on. UB-14 had been sent to keep the rendezvous, reportedly going so far as to radio messages in the latest British code. Only when E20s crew saw the torpedo did they realize something was amiss, but it was too late to avoid the weapon. The torpedo hit E20s conning tower and sank the submarine with the loss of 21 men. UB-14 rescued nine men, including E20s captain who, reportedly, had been brushing his teeth at the time of the attack.

In December, von Heimburg was replaced as UB-14s commander by Kapitänleutnant Albrecht von Dewitz, but in early February 1916, von Heimburg resumed command. UB-14s activities between November and May are not reported in sources, but Paul Halpern reports that UB-14 patrolled in the Black Sea off Trebizond from late May to early June, returning to Constantinople without success.

On 17 June, von Heimburg was recalled to Germany to command the soon-to-be-commissioned , and was replaced on UB-14 by Kapitänleutnant Kurt Schwarz, a first time U-boat commander. Soon after Schwarz assumed command, UB-14 was in the Black Sea in support of a July sortie by the German battlecruiser  and the light cruiser  in the eastern Black Sea. Because the Russian fleet, headquartered at Sevastopol, might have an opportunity to cut off the German warships on the mission, UB-14 was sent on station off Sevastopol.

After Romania joined the war on the side of the Triple Entente in August and was quickly overrun by the Central Powers, the Russian efforts in the Black Sea in the second half of 1916 were focused in the west. Because German submarines never really accomplished all that much in the Black Sea, the February 1917 resumption of unrestricted submarine warfare led the Germans to temporarily abandon the Black Sea in lieu of the more target-rich Mediterranean. UB-14s whereabouts and activities during the latter half of 1916 and the first few months of 1917 are unreported in sources.

On 28 May 1917, Oberleutnant zur See Ernst Ulrich replaced Schwarz, and, soon after, UB-14 sailed on the first German patrol of the year in the Black Sea. On 5 June, UB-14 sank the 155 GRT Russian sailing vessel Karasunda north of Poti; Karasunda was the last ship credited to UB-14. Other than to note that Oberleutnant zur See Bodo Elleke succeeded Ulrich in March 1918, there is no mention in sources of UB-14s activities between June 1917 and November 1918.

After the Russian Soviet Federative Socialist Republic signed the Treaty of Brest-Litovsk with the Central Powers on 3 March 1918, exiting the war, forces of the Central Powers surrounded and later seized the port of Sevastopol. UB-14 was at Sevastopol after the Germany signed the armistice treaty that ended all fighting on 11 November. UB-14 and the three other surviving Constantinople Flotilla boats were disarmed on 25 November. UB-14 was scuttled in the Black Sea off Sevastopol in the early months of 1919.

Summary of raiding history

Gallery

Notes

References

Bibliography 

 

 
 
 
 
 
 
 
 
 
 
 
 
 
 
 
 
 

German Type UB I submarines
Ships built in Bremen (state)
Ships built in Pola
1915 ships
U-boats commissioned in 1915
World War I submarines of Germany
Maritime incidents in 1919
Scuttled vessels of Germany
U-boats sunk in 1919
Shipwrecks in the Black Sea